Mieczysław Broniszewski (born 30 December 1948) is a Polish football manager.

References

1948 births
Living people
Polish football managers
Motor Lublin managers
Polonia Warsaw managers
OKS Stomil Olsztyn managers
Amica Wronki managers
Górnik Zabrze managers
Wisła Płock managers
GKS Katowice managers
Radomiak Radom managers
People from Otwock County
Polish footballers
Wisła Płock players
Association footballers not categorized by position